Coleochlamys is a genus of green algae, in the order Microthamniales.

References

Microthamniales
Trebouxiophyceae genera